The Nokia Lumia 735 is a Windows Phone 8.1 smartphone developed by Nokia. It was unveiled on 4 September 2014 at IFA Berlin, alongside the Lumia 730. The device is a smartphone with a particular emphasis on selfies, aided by a 5-megapixel, wide-angle front-facing camera.

Specifications

Hardware
The Nokia Lumia 735 has a 1.2 GHz quad-core ARM Cortex-A7 (Qualcomm Snapdragon 400 MSM8926), ⁣, a Qualcomm Adreno 305 GPU￼ and has 1 GB of system RAM. The Nokia Lumia 735 and Nokia Lumia 730 Dual SIM come with an internal storage capacity of 8 GB, and also support microSD expansion. The battery can be removed, and a 128 GB capable mini-SD card slot is provided along with wireless charging capability.

In May 2015, Microsoft released a Microsoft-branded version of the device (exclusive to Verizon in the US) with improved hardware (16 GB internal storage versus 8 GB). It comes with a later version of the software.

Software

The Nokia Lumia 735 was released in 2014 and runs the Windows 10 Mobile operating system. All variants of the Lumia 735 are upgradable to Windows 10 Mobile. Users of the phone report that certain apps like Here Maps and Here Drive have been phased out. Both the camera and video capture modes include a 'Pro' function which include HDR for the camera and editing abilities. The Cortana voice assistant allows hands-free voice enabled instructions. Microsoft Cloud enabled services are integrated into the handset.

Variants

See also 

 Microsoft Lumia
 Nokia Lumia 730

References

External links 

 Official page

Nokia Lumia 735

Mobile phones introduced in 2014
Discontinued smartphones
Nokia smartphones
Microsoft Lumia
Windows Phone devices
Mobile phones with user-replaceable battery